Vasylivka is a city in Zaporizhzhia Oblast (province) in southern Ukraine. It serves as the administrative center of Vasylivka Raion. The city is situated on the banks of the Kakhovka Reservoir on the Dnieper River. Population:

History 
The area was settled by the Zaporozhian Cossacks in the 1740s. In 1788, Catherine II of Russia granted the region to a landlord Basil Popowski, a Russian general whose name Vasylivka as his manor still bears. His grandson built the Popov Manor House there. The residence was visited by Anton Makarenko in 1925.

In January 1989, according to the census, population was 16,325.

In January 2013, population was 13,996.

On 7 March 2022, Vasylivka was captured by Russian forces during the 2022 Russian invasion of Ukraine in the Southern Ukraine offensive.

On 12 December 2022, Russian forces began preparing to evacuate the citizens of Vasylivka. The following week, Ukrainian artillery struck Russian positions in the city, destroying military equipment.

On 4 January 2023, Ukrainian forces shelled the headquarters of Russian troops stationed in Vasylivka. Pro-Russian news sources claimed that the strike hit an apartment building and that six people were killed in the strike.

Gallery

References

Cities in Zaporizhzhia Oblast
Cities of district significance in Ukraine
Populated places established in the Russian Empire
Populated places on the Dnieper in Ukraine
Melitopolsky Uyezd